Ralph Nader presidential campaign could refer to:

 Ralph Nader presidential campaign, 1992
 Ralph Nader presidential campaign, 1996
 Ralph Nader presidential campaign, 2000
 Ralph Nader presidential campaign, 2004
 Ralph Nader presidential campaign, 2008